Daria Kasperska (born 27 September 1983) is a Polish football midfielder currently playing for Pogoń Szczecin in the Ekstraliga. She previously played for Czarni Sosnowiec, Gol Częstochowa and Unia Racibórz, playing the Champions League with Unia.

She has been a member of the Polish national team.

References

1983 births
Living people
Women's association football midfielders
Polish women's footballers
Place of birth missing (living people)
Poland women's international footballers
RTP Unia Racibórz players
Pogoń Szczecin (women) players
KKS Czarni Sosnowiec players